Rim Kwang-hyok (born 5 August 1992) is a North Korean footballer who plays as a forward for Kigwancha and the North Korea national team.

Career
Rim was included in North Korea's squad for the 2019 AFC Asian Cup in the United Arab Emirates.

Career statistics

International

International goals

References

External links
 
 
 
 Rim Kwang-hyok  at WorldFootball.com
 Rim Kwang-hyok at DPRKFootball

1992 births
Living people
North Korean footballers
North Korea international footballers
April 25 Sports Club players
Association football forwards
Footballers at the 2014 Asian Games
Asian Games medalists in football
Asian Games silver medalists for North Korea
Medalists at the 2014 Asian Games
2019 AFC Asian Cup players
21st-century North Korean people